Randan is a commune in the Puy-de-Dôme department in Auvergne-Rhône-Alpes in central France.

The place gives its name to Randanite, a soluble silica that occurs as fine earth near Randan and near Algiers.
In the  late 19th century the official composition of the dynamite at the Poudrerie nationale de Vonges and other French powder works was 75% nitroglycerin, 20.8% randanite, 3.8% Vierzon silica and 0.4% magnesium carbonate.

See also
Communes of the Puy-de-Dôme department

References

Communes of Puy-de-Dôme